This is a list of the tallest buildings in the world that are wholly used as hotels. Some tall buildings are multi-use and have a hotel occupying the building's uppermost floors, such hotels are known as the highest hotels in the world. The world's highest hotel is the Rosewood Guangzhou located on the top floors of the 201-story Guangzhou CTF Finance Centre in China, soaring to 530 meters at its highest point.

Completed or topped out
Skyscrapers with multiple functions –e.g., hotel and residential– are not included in this list.

Timeline of the tallest hotels

Hotels under construction
This list contains hotels skyscrapers that are at least  in height and are currently under construction.

See also
 List of tallest buildings in the world
 List of tallest residential buildings in the world
 History of the tallest buildings in the world
 List of cities with most skyscrapers
 List of largest hotels in the world
 Lists of hotels an index of hotel list articles on Wikipedia

Notes
A.  Construction is on hold since 2011.
B.  Topped out but not completed.

References

Lists of construction records
Lists of hotels
Hotels
Hotels